is a Japanese football player. He plays for Fagiano Okayama.

Club career statistics
Updated to 10 August 2022.

References

External links

Fagiano Okayama

1988 births
Living people
Association football people from Tokyo
Japanese footballers
J1 League players
J2 League players
Japan Football League players
Tokyo Verdy players
Fagiano Okayama players
Kamatamare Sanuki players
Matsumoto Yamaga FC players
Association football midfielders